The DuBiel Arms Company was established in 1975 by Joseph T. DuBiel and John Tyson in Sherman, Texas, United States. The company produced premium centerfire bolt-action rifles, manufactured in the US with emphasis on the use of high-quality materials and master-craftmanship. The company ceased operations in the late 1980s. The largest collection of DuBiel rifles today is in the collection of the Cody Firearms Museum of the Buffalo Bill Historical Center in Cody, Wyoming.

Patented DuBiel actions 

DuBiel rifles were constructed using patented DuBiel actions, which featured a five lug bolt locking mechanism resulting in a 36 degree bolt rotation.  The short rotation produced the fastest bolt-action rifle available at the time. The actions were produced in three lengths, both right and left hand configurations.

Patents
United States Patent No. 4152855, Dated May 1979, Inventors:  DuBiel, Joseph T. (Sherman, TX, US) and Tyson, John P. (Denison, TX, US)

References
 DuBiel Arms Company Brochure 1977

External links
J.M. Davis Arms & Historical Museum
Shooting Industry's 1990 directory: manufacturers, importers and wholesalers. shooting industry. (1990 Buyer's Guide)

Firearm manufacturers of the United States
Defunct firearms manufacturers
Manufacturing companies established in 1975
Privately held companies based in Texas
Defunct manufacturing companies based in Texas